The Uninvited Guest is a 1924 American silent drama film directed by Ralph Ince, and starring Maurice "Lefty" Flynn, Jean Tolley, Mary MacLaren, William Bailey, and Louis Wolheim. A print of the film exists in the Russian film archive Gosfilmofond.

Plot
As described in a film magazine review, while voyaging from Australia to New York City, Olive Granger suffers a shipwreck and manages to reach an island. Two other survivors, Irene Carlton and Fred Morgan, gamblers, steal her credentials and go to the United States, where Irene poses as Olive. The latter is rescued by Paul Patterson, a diver, who has to fight off his partner Jan Boomer for her. Boomer meets his demise in the clutching coils of a giant octopus. Paul and Olive arrive in New York City, expose the imposters, and are wed.

Cast
 Maurice Bennett Flynn as Paul "Gin" Patterson
 Jean Tolley as Olive Granger
 Mary MacLaren as Irene Carlton
 William Bailey as Fred Morgan
 Louis Wolheim as Jan Boomer

Production
The film was shot partially in the Bahamas and included scenes made using the Williamson underwater camera, and was released by Metro Pictures a few months before the merger that created Metro-Goldwyn. The film had a sequence filmed in Technicolor.

See also
List of early color feature films

References

External links

1924 films
1920s color films
American silent feature films
Films directed by Ralph Ince
Films shot in the Bahamas
1924 drama films
Silent American drama films
Silent films in color
American black-and-white films
Metro Pictures films
1920s American films